The Edificio Aboy (also El Faro) is a private three-level residence located in San Juan, on the island of Puerto Rico. It is located in Miramar, an area of Santurce, which is a barrio of San Juan.

Made of concrete with metal and wood details, the residence features large bay windows on all floors, and circular balconies that curve around a corner of the building. The  is one of the best representations of Art Deco style on the island of Puerto Rico.

References

National Register of Historic Places in San Juan, Puerto Rico
Houses completed in 1937
1937 establishments in Puerto Rico
Art Deco architecture in Puerto Rico